On 24 August 1984, seven members of the banned All India Sikh Students Federation hijacked an Indian Airlines jetliner Indian Airlines Flight 421 (IATA No.: IC421), a Boeing 737-2A8, on a domestic flight from the Delhi-Palam Airport to Srinagar Airport with 74 people on board and demanded to be flown to the United States. The plane travelled to Lahore, then to Karachi and finally to Dubai, where the defence minister of the United Arab Emirates Mohammed bin Rashid Al Maktoum negotiated the release of the passengers and the surrender of all hijackers to UAE authorities.

It was related to the secessionist insurgency in the Indian state of Punjab. The Khalistan movement was a separatist movement in Indian Punjab and UK where a small portion of the Sikh community openly asked for a different country for Sikh people (Khalistan). The hijackers were subsequently extradited by UAE authorities to India, who handed over the pistol recovered from the hijackers.

Indian civil servant K. Subrahmanyam was on board an Indian Airlines flight (IC 421) on 24 August 1984 when the plane was hijacked. The arrested hijackers later claimed in court that it was Subrahmanyam who "planned the entire hijacking to examine nuclear installations in Pakistan."

IC 421 hijacking was mentioned in the book IA's Terror Trail, written by Anil Sharma. This hijacking was also an important part of the story of 2021 Hindi film Bell Bottom. Indian Airlines, India's sole domestic airline up to 1993, was hijacked 16 times, from 1971 to 1999.

Timeline 
Indian Airlines flight IC421 took off from Palam Airport at New Delhi with 122 passengers, bound for Srinagar via Chandigarh and Jammu in the early hours of 24 August 1984. At Chandigarh 67 passengers disembarked and 31 joined the flight for Jammu and Srinagar. At 7:30AM, seven Sikh passengers - described as being in their twenties and wielding kirpans - stormed into the cockpit and took control of the flight from Captain V.K. Mehta. On taking the cockpit, the hijackers forced the pilot to fly the aircraft to Amritsar and circle above the Golden Temple - the central shrine of the Sikh faith which had been raided in June that year by the Indian Army in an anti-terrorist operation. After two circles above the Golden Temple, the hijackers ordered the aircraft to fly to Lahore, Pakistan. At Lahore the aircraft had to circle the city for nearly 80 minutes before it was finally allowed to land by the Pakistani authorities at 9:50AM due to dangerously low fuel levels.

Indian Prime Minister Indira Gandhi spoke with Pakistani President Zia-Ul-Haq and requested him not to allow the aircraft to leave Lahore airport. The Indian government believed that since the hijackers were lightly armed, they could have very easily been neutralized by having special forces storm the aircraft.

On meeting with Pakistani officials on the tarmac at Lahore, the hijackers demanded that the aircraft be re-fueled and flown to the United States of America. The Pakistanis agreed to refuel the aircraft, but advised that the aircraft lacked the range to fly to the Western Hemisphere. The hijackers allowed five passengers, including a three-member family, to leave the aircraft at Lahore. At 7 PM, one of the hijackers produced a revolver and used it to force Captain Mehta to take off from Lahore. Two British Nationals on board the flight later recounted that Pakistani officials had handed a paper wrapped packet to the hijackers, and that the revolver had been produced from this packet.

On departing from Lahore, the hijackers demanded that Captain Mehta fly them to Bahrain. When Mehta refused - citing unfavorable flying conditions - the aircraft was diverted to Karachi where it landed. At Karachi, the hijackers allowed 2 women holding British passports to leave the aircraft. After sitting on the tarmac for an hour where it was further re-fueled, the aircraft took off and headed for Dubai. On approaching Dubai airport, the UAE authorities refused permission to land, switching off the runway lights as well as the radio beacon, in spite of Mehta's repeated pleas. By 5AM the next morning the aircraft was again facing dangerously low fuel levels and the flight crew made announcements asking all passengers to prepare for a water landing. When Mehta informed the UAE authorities of his plans to ditch the aircraft in the waters off Dubai, permission was finally given to land. The aircraft landed at 4:55AM local time with just 5 minutes of fuel left.

At 8 AM, UAE Defence Minister, Sheikh Mohammed Bin Rashid Al Maktoum, reached the airport's control tower and began negotiations with the hijackers. At 10:05AM, a white Mercedes car was sent to the aircraft and returned with one of the hijackers for face-to-face negotiations with Sheikh Rashid inside the airport terminal building. At 11:40AM, a van filled with food and water for the hostages was dispatched, but this was turned back by the hijackers. At 12:35PM, 2 ambulances were summoned to the aircraft when one of its passengers -  K. Subrahmanyam, director of the Delhi-based Institute for Defence Studies and Analysis - complained that he required insulin injections for his diabetes. Subrahmanyam and an accompanying hijacker returned to the aircraft after the insulin dose was administered inside one of the ambulances.

At 1:45PM, after repeated requests from Sheikh Rashid, the hijackers finally allowed food and water to be brought on board for the hostages. 

During negotiations with the UAE authorities, the hijackers demanded safe passage to the US as well as political asylum there. The US Consul General in Dubai, David Stockwell, reached the airport during the negotiations but later announced that "Our position is very clear. If they go to the US, they will be arrested." At one point in the negotiations, the hijackers wanted to be flown to London and the authorities began to make plans for a refueling stop in Istanbul.

At 2:30PM, the hijackers forced Subrahmanyam to convey to the negotiators over radio their intention to commence execution of one hostage every half hour - starting with Subrahmanyam - if their demands were not met. No executions were however carried out. At 4PM 2 of the hijackers were taken to the terminal building for further negotiations, At 5:30PM when they had not yet returned, the remaining hijackers threatened to detonate an explosive device on board the aircraft. At 5:55PM the 2 hijackers returned to the aircraft, leaving again at 6:20PM only to return after 10 minutes.

At 6:50PM Dubai Chief of Police Colonel Dahi Khalfan Tamim announced to the press that the hijackers had been put under protective custody and that they had surrendered unconditionally. At 7PM, Two Dubai National Airlines Transport Authority passenger coaches arrived and all passengers and crew members were taken to the terminal building. The hijackers were then detained by the UAE authorities. The UAE authorities initially promised a seven-day asylum to the hijackers before their departure to the United States. In subsequent discussions with UAE and Indian officials, the hijackers were given 2 options: extradition back to India, or prosecution for air piracy under UAE law. All hijackers were later extradited to India.

See also 
 List of hijackings of Indian aeroplanes#1980s
 List of aircraft hijackings#1980s
 Bell Bottom
 List of accidents and incidents involving airliners by location#India
 List of accidents and incidents involving airliners by airline (D–O)#I
 List of accidents and incidents involving commercial aircraft#1984

References

External links 

 

Aviation accidents and incidents in 1984
Aircraft hijackings in Pakistan
Aviation accidents and incidents in the United Arab Emirates
Aircraft hijackings in India
Aviation accidents and incidents in India
Sikh terrorism in India
Terrorist incidents in India in 1984
Hostage taking in India
Indian (airline) accidents and incidents
1984 in India
Indira Gandhi administration
Aircraft hijackings
Terrorist incidents in India
1984 disasters in the United Arab Emirates